Njerve is a Norwegian surname. Notable people with the surname include:

 Jan Thomas Njerve (1927–2014), Norwegian painter
 Sigurd Njerve (born 1971), Norwegian triple jumper

Norwegian-language surnames